Southpaw is a 2015 American sports drama film directed by Antoine Fuqua, written by Kurt Sutter and starring Jake Gyllenhaal, Forest Whitaker and Rachel McAdams. The film follows a boxer who sets out to get his life back on track after losing his wife in an accident and later his young daughter to child protective services. The film was released on July 24, 2015, by The Weinstein Company. The film received mixed reviews from critics, while Gyllenhaal and Oona Laurence's performances received positive reviews.

The movie was set in New York City, but it was filmed in Pittsburgh and the nearby town of Indiana, Pennsylvania.

The film marked one of the last films to be scored by James Horner and the first of three posthumous releases to feature his music (the other two being The 33 and The Magnificent Seven). The film and the film's soundtrack album are dedicated to his memory.

Plot

Billy "The Great" Hope (Jake Gyllenhaal) is a professional boxer, and the reigning champion in the Light Heavyweight division with an Orthodox stance and a won-loss record of 42-0, living in New York City with his wife Maureen (Rachel McAdams) and their only daughter Leila (Oona Laurence). During his match against Darius Jones (Cedric D. Jones) at Madison Square Garden, Maureen is scared as Billy takes several horrific hits to the face, resulting in profuse bleeding out of his eye. Billy wins the match by knockout and retains the light heavyweight title, despite nasty injuries.

As the press surrounds Billy, a younger upstart boxer, Miguel "Magic" Escobar (Miguel Gomez), taunts Billy to fight him. Upon returning home, Maureen fears for Billy's safety and urges him to quit. Later at the Hope house, Maureen talks to Billy's manager Jordan Mains (50 Cent), and disagrees with his plan to get Billy to sign a two-year deal for three more fights.

Billy and Maureen go to a fundraiser ball where Billy gives a speech, acknowledging Maureen, Leila, Jordan and his friends. Miguel is in attendance as well, and as Billy is leaving, Miguel goads him by insulting Maureen and saying he will take his titles away from him, leading to a brawl. A gunshot (from Miguel's brother Hector) rings out and Billy sees that Maureen has been shot. Hector flees while Maureen dies in Billy's arms.

Shortly thereafter, Billy begins abusing alcohol and drugs. Billy meets with Jordan, who suggests selling the house to solve his financial problems. Jordan then books Billy a fight against Kalil Turay, in which Billy gets beaten up so badly that his corner throws in the towel. Blinded by damage due to headshots, Billy accidentally headbutts the referee in the face. Billy is suspended for a year and has no income, while he owes the ref and the networks damages. His house and belongings are repossessed. Both Jordan and longtime trainer Eli Frost abandon him to work with Miguel.

Billy runs his car into the tree outside his home one night. Leila finds Billy bleeding on the floor and calls 911. Billy wakes up in the hospital to learn that Leila is being put in the care of Child Protective Services officer Angela Rivera (Naomie Harris). With nowhere left to go, Billy visits the Wills Gym where he meets former boxer Tick Wills (Forest Whitaker), who is blind in one eye after his last fight left him injured. Billy wants Tick to get him back on his feet, but Tick knows about his drug problems and declines to train him. He offers Billy a janitorial job.

Billy meets with Angela to see Leila. However, Leila blames him for their problems and refuses to see him. Billy returns to the gym and accepts the janitorial job. While working there, he befriends a boy named Hoppy (Skylan Brooks), who is also an aspiring boxer. He learns that Hoppy's father abuses his mother, which he reports to Tick. As he starts to make amends in his life, Billy continues visiting Leila, and his persistence wins her over. After winning a charity match, Billy is visited by Jordan. He now manages Miguel, who recently won the championship from Kalil Turay. Jordan wants to book a fight between the two within six weeks, knowing that Billy will not have enough time to train. Billy thinks he can make a comeback and wants Tick to train him, but Tick refuses, believing Billy just wants revenge.

Billy later learns from Tick that Hoppy has died after trying to defend his mother from his father, who shot him. Lamenting that he could not save Hoppy, Tick decides to help Billy train for the upcoming fight. Noting his efforts to turn his life around, the judge grants Billy custody of Leila and she moves back in with him. Visiting Maureen's grave together, Billy tells Leila he is going to fight again, and grants her wish of letting her remain present.

On the night of the fight, Angela brings Leila into the dressing room where they watch it on TV. Miguel takes the early upper hand. Both fighters trade furious punches, round after round. Miguel then insults Maureen, causing Billy to lose concentration. In a fit of rage, Billy lashes out and almost stops the fight. Tick cautions Billy not to let Miguel control him. Billy controls his anger and in the final round, gains the upper hand against Miguel. In the final seconds, Billy blocks a jab from Miguel and lands a shot to the face before turning southpaw and, with a furious uppercut, sends Miguel to the canvas. Miguel gets up at the last second and both corners are filled with two teams' staffs.

Despite a split decision (final score 344-341 Billy had 3 points over Miguel) giving the first rounds to Miguel, Billy is announced as the new champion. Billy then collapses in the corner, thanking Maureen and committing himself to Leila. Tick and the team lift him up on their shoulders as he closes his eyes tearfully and smiles. After the fight, Leila meets Billy in the dressing room, where they hug for the first time since Maureen's death. Billy says Maureen would be proud of her and she tells him she loves him.

Cast

 Jake Gyllenhaal as Billy "The Great" Hope
 Forest Whitaker as Titus "Tick" Wills
 Rachel McAdams as Maureen Hope
 Oona Laurence as Leila Hope	
 Naomie Harris as Angela Rivera
 Curtis "50 Cent" Jackson as Jordan Mains
 Miguel Gomez as Miguel "Magic" Escobar 
 Danny Henriquez as Hector Escobar
 Rita Ora as Maria Escobar
 Skylan Brooks as Hoppy
 Victor Ortiz as Ramone		
 Beau Knapp as Jon Jon	
 Malcolm Mays as Gabe 
 Clare Foley as Alice
 Jim Lampley as himself
 Roy Jones Jr. as himself

Production
Eminem was originally supposed to play the role of Billy Hope. The film's screenwriter Kurt Sutter said the project was inspired by the rapper's personal struggles. He stated that he had taken meetings with Eminem's producing partners over the past seven years, looking for something to do together. "I know he's very selective and doesn't do a lot. But he shared so much of his personal struggle in this raw and very honest album, one that I connected with on a lot of levels. He is very interested in the boxing genre, and it seemed like an apt metaphor, because his own life has been a brawl. In a way, this is a continuation of the 8 Mile story, but we are doing a metaphorical narrative of the second chapter of his life. He'll play a world champion boxer who really hits a hard bottom, and has to fight to win back his life for his young daughter. At its core, this is a retelling of his struggles over the last five years of his life, using the boxing analogy. I love that the title refers to Marshall being a lefty, which is to boxing what a white rapper is to hip hop; dangerous, unwanted, and completely unorthodox. It's a much harder road for a southpaw than a right-handed boxer." Producers Alan and Peter Riche have given a slightly different story about Eminem's involvement however stating that they set out to make a boxing movie similar to The Champ but wanted to make the story about a father-daughter relationship as opposed to The Champs father-son story. Recalling Eminem's strong relationship with his daughter, they asked him and he was immediately receptive.

On December 13, 2010, DreamWorks acquired the script, with Eminem eyed to play the lead role, however the following August the studio dropped the project. Metro-Goldwyn-Mayer picked up the film that October. in December 2012, Eminem dropped out of the film to focus instead on his music. Antoine Fuqua signed on to the project in March 2014 with Jake Gyllenhaal replacing Eminem. Other casting news was announced in May 2014 with Forest Whitaker, Lupita Nyong'o, and Rachel McAdams officially joining the cast. In August of that year, it was announced that Naomie Harris would be replacing Nyong'o. Tyrese Gibson was cast but his scenes were cut from the film.

Gyllenhaal did research for his role by doing "tons of reading on boxers, orphan boxers, the spirit of gyms all over America, children who start early, [and] the history of foster care in America" while also spending five months training as a boxer. Eminem would later praise Gyllenhaal's performance, noting that "Jake smashed it" in an interview with Zane Lowe.

Southpaw marks the first investment in an American film by Wanda Pictures, a division of Wang Jianlin's Chinese conglomerate Dalian Wanda Group. Principal photography began on June 16, 2014.

It was originally to be set in Detroit, yet Pittsburgh was chosen for the filming and was used as a double for New York.

Release
The film had its world premiere at the 2015 Shanghai International Film Festival on June 15, 2015, where it was in competition, and was released on July 24, 2015, by The Weinstein Company.

Reception

Box office
Southpaw grossed $52.4 million in North America and $38.5 million in other territories for a total gross of $92 million, against a budget of $30 million.

In its opening weekend, the film grossed $16.7 million from 2,772 theaters, finishing 5th at the box office.

Critical response
The review aggregator website Rotten Tomatoes gives the film a rating of 60%, based on 238 reviews, with a weighted average of 6.00/10. The site's critical consensus reads, "Jake Gyllenhaal delivers an impressively committed performance, but Southpaw beats it down with a dispiriting drama that pummels viewers with genre clichés." On Metacritic, the film has a score of 57 out of 100, based on 42 critics, indicating "mixed or average reviews". On CinemaScore, audiences gave the film an average grade of "A" on an A+ to F scale.

Soren Anderson of The Seattle Times gave the film two and a half stars out of four, saying "Southpaw, a boxing movie with a theme of redemption, is redeemed by the performances of its two main actors, Jake Gyllenhaal and Forest Whitaker." Kyle Smith of the New York Post gave the film one and a half stars out of four, saying "It brings back every stale genre convention you can think of, then hopes you won't recognize predictability pumped up with swearing and steroids and an Eminem song during the training montage." Ty Burr of The Boston Globe gave the film two and a half stars out of four, saying "This is a genre with especially sturdy bones, and when Southpaw connects, which is more often than you might expect, you feel it down to your toes." Ann Hornaday of The Washington Post gave the film one and a half stars out of four, saying "Southpaw may be rote, predictable and mawkish, but none of those faults lie in its star. Even when he looks like an unholy mess, he transcends the movie he's in." Steven Rea of The Philadelphia Inquirer gave the film three out of four stars, saying "What keeps this cornball business from getting out of hand is the commitment of Gyllenhaal, whose performance is fierce and muscular, in and out of the ring." Michael Phillips of the Chicago Tribune gave the film two and a half stars out of four, saying "The script may have hamburger for brains, but Fuqua slams it home with the help of actors who give their all – even when giving a little less might have made things more interesting."

Peter Howell of the Toronto Star gave the film two and a half stars out of four, saying "This isn't great cinema, but it's satisfying movie-making, with nothing more on its mind than telling a heart-tugging story." A. O. Scott of The New York Times said, "I wish I could say Southpaw was a knockout, or even a contender, that it went the distance or scored on points. But it's strictly an undercard bout, displaying enough heart and skill to keep the paying customers from getting too restless." Benjamin Nugent of The New York Times has compared the film to Robert De Niro stating, "Pity Jake Gyllenhaal, who despite getting shredded for Southpaw, could not outbox the shadow of Robert De Niro's Raging Bull performance." Chris Nashawaty of Entertainment Weekly gave the film a C+, saying "Just as director Antoine Fuqua starts to close in on something interesting and unexpected, he retreats to the safety of his corner and gives us what we've seen too many times before: a predictable flurry of melodramatic jabs." Barbara VanDenburgh of The Arizona Republic gave the film three out of five stars, saying "Southpaw is all about the fist. There's no delicate footwork here, no lingering grace notes. It's a film played entirely in power chords." James Berardinelli of ReelViews gave the film three out of four stars, saying "Southpaw isn't content with presenting a gallery of clichéd characters. It takes the time to put flesh on the bones." Colin Covert of the Star Tribune gave the film one out of four stars, slamming Gyllenhaal's performance, saying "As a troubled slugger, Gyllenhaal is impressively muscle-bound, but gives no knockout performance. His work drags on like 12 rounds of fistfight fatigue."

Accolades

Soundtrack

Eminem executive-produced the soundtrack, which was released by Shady Records on July 24, 2015. He had previously released his single called "Phenomenal" from the soundtrack on June 2, 2015.

An album of James Horner's score was released through Sony Classical on July 24, 2015. This was Horner's final score (it was recorded after The 33, although Southpaw was released first); he was killed in a plane crash on June 22, 2015.

References

External links
 
 
 
 

2015 films
2010s sports drama films
American sports drama films
Chinese boxing films
Chinese sports drama films
2010s English-language films
American boxing films
Films scored by James Horner
Films about death
Films about drugs
Films directed by Antoine Fuqua
Films produced by Antoine Fuqua
Films set in New York City
Films set in New York (state)
Films shot in New York City
Films shot in New York (state)
Films shot in Pittsburgh
Escape Artists films
Wanda Pictures films
2015 drama films
2010s American films
English-language Chinese films